Parastenolechia argobathra is a moth of the family Gelechiidae. It is found in Korea, Japan, the Russian Far East and China.

The wingspan is 14–15 mm. Adults are similar to Parastenolechia superba, but can be distinguished by the costal patch and antemedian fascia, which are widely suffused with dark brown scales.

References

Moths described in 1935
Parastenolechia